Wingold Lawrence (1874–1938) was a British actor. Lawrence emerged as a prominent stage actor of the London theatre. He also enjoyed a brief film career, with leading roles in films such as Eugene Aram (1914) and Mysteries of London (1915).

Selected filmography
 Eugene Aram (1914)
 Mysteries of London (1915)

References

Bibliography
 Palmer, Scott. British Film Actors' Credits, 1895-1987. McFarland, 1988.

External links

Male actors from London
1874 births
1938 deaths
English male film actors
English male silent film actors
English male stage actors
20th-century English male actors